is a Japanese organic chemist and Professor of Chemistry at University of Tokyo in Japan. He discovered the Fukuyama coupling in 1998.

Biography
Fukuyama studied chemistry at Nagoya University with degrees Bachelor's (1971) and Master's (1973) degrees. As a graduate student, he then worked at Harvard University, where he received his doctorate in 1977 as an academic student of Yoshito Kishi. Until 1978, he continued his research as a postdoc in the Department of Chemistry of Harvard University and then moved to Rice University as an assistant professor, where in 1988 he obtained the rank of a chair holder. In 1995, he accepted a professorship in Pharmaceutical Sciences from the University of Tokyo, Japan. Since 2013, Fukuyama has been working as a professor at the Nagoya University - more precisely: Designated Professor of Pharmaceutical Sciences.

The 2015 Nobel Prize in Physiology or Medicine winner Satoshi Ōmura is his old friend.

Achievements
Fukuyama reduction
Fukuyama indole synthesis
Fukuyama coupling

Selected publications
  Practical Total Synthesis of (±)-Mitomycin C, T. Fukuyama and L.-H. Yang, J. Am. Chem. Soc., 111, 8303–8304 (1989).
  Facile Reduction of Ethyl Thiol Esters to Aldehydes: Application to a Total Synthesis of (+)-Neothramycin A Methyl Ether, T. Fukuyama, S.-C. Lin, and L.-P. Li, J. Am. Chem. Soc., 112, 7050–7051 (1990).
 Total Synthesis of (+)-Leinamycin, Y. Kanda and T. Fukuyama, J. Am. Chem. Soc., 115, 8451–8452 (1993).
  2- and 4-Nitrobenzenesulfonamides: Exceptionally Versatile Means for Preparation of Secondary Amines and Protection of Amines, T. Fukuyama, C.-K. Jow, and M. Cheung, Tetrahedron Lett., 36, 6373–6374 (1995).
  “Radical Cyclization of 2-Alkenylthioanilides: A Novel Synthesis of 2,3-Disubstituted Indoles,” H. Tokuyama, T. Yamashita, M. T. Reding, Y. Kaburagi, and T. Fukuyama, J. Am. Chem. Soc., 121, 3791–3792 (1999).
  Stereocontrolled Total Synthesis of (+)-Vinblastine, S. Yokoshima, T. Ueda, S. Kobayashi, A. Sato, T. Kuboyama, H. Tokuyama, and T. Fukuyama, J. Am. Chem. Soc., 124, 2137–2139 (2002).
 Total Synthesis of (+)-Yatakemycin, K. Okano, H. Tokuyama, and T. Fukuyama, J. Am. Chem. Soc., 128, 7136–7137 (2006).
  A Practical Synthesis of (–)-Oseltamivir, N. Satoh, T. Akiba, S. Yokoshima, and T. Fukuyama, Angew. Chem. Int. Ed., 46, 5734–5736 (2007).
  A Practical Synthesis of (–)-Kainic Acid, S. Takita, S. Yokoshima, and T. Fukuyama, Org. Lett., 13, 2068–2070 (2011).
 Total Synthesis of Ecteinascidin 743, F. Kawagishi, T. Toma, T. Inui, S. Yokoshima, and T. Fukuyama, J. Am. Chem. Soc., 135, 13684–13687 (2013).

References

Homepage of Tohru Fukuyama
CV of Fukuyama

1948 births
Living people
People from Anjō
Japanese chemists
Rice University faculty
Academic staff of the University of Tokyo
Harvard University alumni
Nagoya University alumni